Babanrao Shankar Gholap alias Nana is an Indian politician, from Nashik district. He was Member of the Maharashtra Legislative Assembly from Deolali Vidhan Sabha constituency as member of  Shiv Sena. He had been elected to Vidhan Sabha for five consecutive terms in 1990-2009. He was Cabinet  Minister of Social Welfare in Maharashtra Government.

Positions held
 1990: Elected to Maharashtra Legislative Assembly (1st term)
 1995: Re-elected to Maharashtra Legislative Assembly (2nd term)
 1995-99: Cabinet  Minister of Social Welfare of Maharashtra
 1999: Re-elected to Maharashtra Legislative Assembly (3rd term)
 2004: Re-elected to Maharashtra Legislative Assembly (4th term)
 2009: Re-elected to Maharashtra Legislative Assembly (5th term)
 2010 Onwards: Deputy Leader, Shiv Sena

See also
 Manohar Joshi Ministry
 Nashik Lok Sabha constituency

References

External links
 Shiv Sena Official website

Shiv Sena politicians
Maharashtra MLAs 1990–1995
Maharashtra MLAs 1995–1999
Maharashtra MLAs 1999–2004
Maharashtra MLAs 2004–2009
Maharashtra MLAs 2009–2014
Living people
People from Nashik district
Indian politicians disqualified from office
Marathi politicians
Year of birth missing (living people)